Roseburg National Cemetery is a United States National Cemetery located in Roseburg in Douglas County, Oregon. Administered by the United States Department of Veterans Affairs, it encompasses , and as of 2014, had more than 5,400 interments. It is managed by the Eagle Point National Cemetery.

History 
Roseburg National Cemetery was established in 1897 to inter veterans who died while under care at the Oregon State Soldiers Home. In 1933, management was transferred to the Veteran's Administration, and in 1973, it became a National Cemetery.

Monuments
 POW Memorial – donated by Veterans of 20th Century.

External links
 National Cemetery Administration
 Roseburg National Cemetery
 
 
 

Cemeteries in Oregon
Historic American Landscapes Survey in Oregon
United States national cemeteries
Buildings and structures in Roseburg, Oregon
Protected areas of Douglas County, Oregon
1897 establishments in Oregon